"Who Will Comfort Me" is a song written and composed by American jazz singer-songwriter Melody Gardot. It was released as the lead single for her second studio album My One and Only Thrill. A live rendition of the song was also recorded and released on her Live from SoHo EP.

Song information
The lyrics are very simple, consisting in Gardot asking who will comfort her weary soul. Musically, it combines finger-snapping, scat singing and several percussion instruments.

Music video
The music video for "Who Will Comfort Me" was directed by Doug Biro. It features Gardot performing the song with her backing band inside a studio. The performance is intercut with scenes of Gardot exploring the city.

Track listings
CD single
"Who Will Comfort Me" – 4:58

German 7" Promo single"Who Will Comfort Me" – 4:58
"Over the Rainbow" – 4:33Al Schmitt Mix Promo single
"Who Will Comfort Me" – Radio Edit (Al Schmitt Mix) – 3:42

Chart positions

References

External links

2009 singles
Melody Gardot songs
2009 songs
Verve Records singles
Songs written by Melody Gardot